Bruynoghevirus is a genus of viruses in the order Caudovirales, in the family Podoviridae. Bacteria serve as natural hosts. There are seven species in this genus.

Taxonomy
The following species are recognized:
 Pseudomonas virus Ab22
 Pseudomonas virus CHU
 Pseudomonas virus LUZ24
 Pseudomonas virus PAA2
 Pseudomonas virus PaP3
 Pseudomonas virus PaP4
 Pseudomonas virus TL

Structure
Viruses in Bruynoghevirus are non-enveloped, with an icosahedral head (63 nm) and a short tail (12x8 nm). Although these phages produce small and turbid plaques, all attempts to isolate stable lysogenic P. aeruginosa clones failed. In addition, their genome (around 45kb) does not encode obvious genes indicative of lysogeny. Genomes are linear, around 45kb in length.

Life cycle
Viral replication is cytoplasmic. Entry into the host cell is achieved by adsorption into the host cell. DNA templated transcription is the method of transcription. Bacteria serve as the natural host. Transmission routes are passive diffusion.

References

External links
 Viralzone: Luz24likevirus
 ICTV

Podoviridae
Virus genera